Émile-Félicien Lombard (1883 - ?) was a French painter.

References

External links
 Emile Félicien Lombard - Le Débarcadère

1883 births
19th-century French painters
French male painters
20th-century French painters
20th-century French male artists
Year of death missing
19th-century French male artists